Hoover Creek is a stream in the U.S. state of Missouri. It is a tributary of the Middle Fork Salt River.

Hoover Creek most likely has the name of the local Hoover family.

See also
List of rivers of Missouri

References

Rivers of Macon County, Missouri
Rivers of Randolph County, Missouri
Rivers of Missouri